Patrick Joseph Russ (January 8, 1940 – February 4, 1984) was an American football defensive tackle who played college football for Purdue and professional football in the National Football League (NFL) for the Minnesota Vikings.

Early years
A native of Cincinnati, Russ attended Roger Bacon High School and then played college football for Purdue from 1959 to 1961. He and Larry Bowie anchored the defensive line on the 1961 Purdue Boilermakers football team that was ranked No. 11 in the final UPI poll and led the Big Ten Conference in rushing defense, giving up an average of only 121 yards per game.

Professional football
He was drafted by the Minnesota Vikings in the 14th round (185th overall pick) of the 1962 NFL Draft. He impressed the Vikings' coaching staff during the 1962 pre-season but was placed on waivers prior to the start of the regular season and spent the 1962 on the club's taxi squad. He played for the Vikings during the 1963 season, appearing in a total of 14 NFL games. He was with the Vikings during the 1964 pre-season but was cut in early September as part of the final roster cuts.

He joined the Oakland Raiders of the American Football League in 1965 but was cut before the start of the regular season. He then played for the Hartford Charter Oaks of the Continental Football League (CoFL) during the 1965 and 1966 seasons.

Later years
Russ died in 1984 at age 44 in Cincinnati.

References

1940 births
1984 deaths
American football defensive tackles
Minnesota Vikings players
Purdue Boilermakers football players
Players of American football from Cincinnati